The 1949 Santa Clara Broncos football team was an American football team that represented Santa Clara University as an independent during the 1949 college football season. In their fourth season under head coach Len Casanova, the Broncos compiled an 8–2–1 record, were ranked No. 15 in the final AP Poll, and outscored all opponents by a combined total of 222 to 114.

The Broncos' victories included a 14–0 besting of UCLA, a 19–6 victory over Saint Mary's, and a 21–13 victory over Bear Bryant's Kentucky Wildcats in the 1950 Orange Bowl. The team's two losses came against Pacific Coast Conference champion California (ranked No. 3 in the final AP Poll) and undefeated Oklahoma (ranked No. 2 in the AP Poll).

Guard Vern Sterling was selected by both the Associated Press and International News Service as a first-team player on the 1949 All-Pacific Coast football team.

After the 1949 season, coach Casanova left Santa Clara to become head coach at Pittsburgh. He also served as head coach at Oregon from 1951 to 1966.

Schedule

References

Santa Clara
Santa Clara Broncos football seasons
Orange Bowl champion seasons
Santa Clara Broncos football